Nesa-e Olya (also Romanized as Nesā’-e ‘Olyā; also known as Nesā’-e Bālā and Nesā’) is a village in Bala Taleqan Rural District, in the Central District of Taleqan County, Alborz Province, Iran. At the 2006 census, its population was 356, in 84 families.

References 

Populated places in Taleqan County